King's Landing can refer to:

King's Landing (A Song of Ice and Fire), capital of the fictional continent of Westeros in the George R. R. Martin fantasy series A Song of Ice and Fire and the derived TV series Game of Thrones
King's Landing, luxury condominium in Toronto which houses the Walter  Carsen Centre and was designed by Arthur Erickson
Kings Landing Historical Settlement, historic area in New Brunswick, Canada